Thapsia, commonly known as the deadly carrots, is a small genus of poisonous plants in the family Apiaceae. Their center of diversity is around the western Mediterranean, extending into the Atlantic coasts of Portugal and Morocco. Some species are used in traditional medicine.

Description
Species of Thapsia are herbaceous perennials, growing 50 to 200 cm high. The inflorescences are large, regularly distributed umbels. The seeds have four wings, and are the main characteristic of the genus, which is distributed in the Mediterranean, on the Iberian peninsula, and North Africa.

The generic name Thapsia is derived from the Ancient Greek name θαψία (thapsía) for the members of the genus. The Greeks believe it to have originated from ancient Thapsos in Sicily. It has a long history of being used in ancient traditional medicine. Algerians used it as a pain-reliever though they recognized that the plant was deadly to camels. The Greek colony of Cyrene exported a medicinal plant known as silphion, used as a purgative and emetic. Although its exact identity remains contentious today, some historians believe that the plant may have been Thapsia garganica.

Cancer research
The chemical compound thapsigargin has been isolated from Thapsia garganica. A synthetic prodrug of thapsigargin called "G-202" is in preliminary clinical trials for cancer treatment. The active constituent kills tumor cells by destroying their calcium balance. A biotech company called GenSpera, Inc. in San Antonio, TX is studying methods of delivering thapsigargin directly to cancer cells, avoiding damage to other cells in the body of the patient.

Antiviral research
This same chemical compound thapsigargin is now being looked at as an antiviral to use against SARS-coV-2, the coronavirus virus that causes COVID-19. It has not yet reached the clinical trial stage.

Species
About 21 species of Thapsia are currently recognized. It is, however, a complex genus, and some authors may recognize different numbers of species.
 Thapsia asclepium
 Thapsia cinerea A.Pujadas
 Thapsia decussata Lag.
 Thapsia eliasii
 Thapsia foetida
 Thapsia garganica L.  
 Thapsia gummifera
 Thapsia gymnesica Rosselló & A.Pujadas
 Thapsia meoides
 Thapsia minor Hoffmans & Link
 Thapsia nestleri
 Thapsia nitida Lacaita  
 Thapsia pelagica
 Thapsia platycarpa Pomel 
 Thapsia scabra
 Thapsia smittii
 Thapsia tenuifolia
 Thapsia thapsioides
 Thapsia transtagana Brot.
 Thapsia villosa L.

Gallery

References

External links

Medicinal plants
Apioideae
Apioideae genera